Joan Barnett (November 19, 1945 – October 15, 2020) was an American casting director and television executive producer. She was best known for producing many television films, notably Adam (1983), which earned her a Primetime Emmy Award nomination.

Career
Barnett began her career as an associate producer and general manager for Alexander H. Cohen in New York, working on television specials, films and Broadway productions. In 1974, she moved to California and opened a casting company with Linda Otto.

Otto/Barnett Associates cast more than 100 television pilots, films, and series. Their efforts also cast an old high school friend named Billy Crystal as one of the leads in the television sitcom Soap (1977–1981).

Barnett followed her casting career by becoming the head of films for NBC, where she put the television films Special Bulletin (1983) and The Burning Bed (1984) in development. She then departed for full-time producing with the Alan Landsburg Productions, where she made Adam (1983) and Unspeakable Acts (1990), both changing the face of docudramas for television, as well as the cult sports film Long Gone (1987) for HBO.

In 1989, Barnett partnered with Jack Grossbart and began a 15-year period of production that included Something to Live for: The Alison Gertz Story (1992), Unforgivable (1996), and Any Mother's Son (1997). All were true stories that had impact in changing laws and raising important information on critical issues.

Barnett retired in 2005 to be near family in Boston. During that time, she was actively involved with Planned Parenthood, where she served on the board.

Awards and nominations

References

External links
 

1945 births
2020 deaths
American casting directors
Women casting directors
American women television producers
Television producers from New York City
People associated with Planned Parenthood
21st-century American women